Brionne Kierra Butler (born January 29, 1999) is an American professional volleyball player who plays as a middle blocker for the United States women's national volleyball team and Italian Series A1 professional league Chieri.

Early life

Butler was born in Louisiana to Brian Butler and Javonne Brooks and grew up in Kendleton, Texas. Her mother played volleyball for University of New Orleans and holds 2nd place in the NCAA record books for career kills.

She attended high school at Boling High School, and was the #2 nationally ranked recruit in her graduating class. While in high school, she was on the Junior USA national team. She eventually committed to play for the University of Texas.

Career

College
After redshirting her freshman season in 2017, Butler played as a starting middle blocker the remaining three years of her collegiate career, earning First Team All-American honors her senior year. In her senior season in 2020, she led the NCAA in total blocks. She helped Texas to a national runner-up finish at the 2020 NCAA tournament, and was named to the NCAA Final Four All-Tournament Team. Additionally, she helped Texas to Big 12 Conference titles every year she was on the team.

Professional clubs

  Gresik Petrokimia (2021–2022)
  Chieri (2022–)

USA National Team
While still in college, Butler made her U.S. national team debut at the 2019 Women's Pan-American Volleyball Cup, earning a gold medal with the team. 

In May 2022, Butler was named to the 25-player roster for the 2022 FIVB Volleyball Nations League tournament.

Awards and honors

Clubs

 2022 Indonesian Proliga –  Silver medal, with Gresik Petrokimia.

International

2022  Pan-American Cup, Bronze Medal with the U.S. National Team.
2019  Pan-American Cup, Gold Medal with the U.S. National Team.

College

AVCA First Team All-American (2020)
All-Big 12 First Team (2018, 2019, 2020)
Volleyball Magazine Second Team All-American (2019)

References

1999 births
Living people
Sportspeople from Texas
Middle blockers
American women's volleyball players
Texas Longhorns women's volleyball players
American expatriate sportspeople in Indonesia
American expatriate sportspeople in Italy
Expatriate volleyball players in Italy
Expatriate volleyball players in Indonesia
21st-century African-American sportspeople
21st-century African-American women